Vadym Synyavsky (born 2 December 1987 in Zaporizhzhia Oblast) is a former male Ukrainian judoka. He is a bronze medalist of the 2015 European Games in the team event and a bronze medalist of both the 2012 and 2017 European Championships in the team events as well. In the individual competition at the 2015 European Games, Synyavsky lost in the round of 32 to Nikoloz Sherazadishvili from Spain.

Synyavsky competed at three World Championships. In 2011 in Paris, he defeated Mark Anthony from Australia and Chingiz Mamedov from Kyrgyzstan, but lost to Kirill Denisov from Russia in the round of 16. In 2014 in Chelyabinsk, he lost to Mashu Baker from Japan in the round of 64. In 2015 in Astana, he defeated Thomas Briceño from Chile, but lost to the eventual World champion Gwak Dong-han from South Korea in the round of 32. He was also 7th at the 2009 European Championships.

Synyavsky had several successes in several Grand Prix competitions. He was third at the 2009 Judo Grand Prix Hamburg, 2011 Judo Grand Prix Düsseldorf and 2014 Judo Grand Prix Tbilisi.

References

External links
 

1987 births
Living people
Ukrainian male judoka
Sportspeople from Zaporizhzhia Oblast
Judoka at the 2015 European Games
European Games medalists in judo
European Games bronze medalists for Ukraine